Hemel Hempstead Rural District was a rural district in Hertfordshire, England from 1894 to 1974.

Evolution
The district had its origins in the Hemel Hempstead Rural Sanitary District. This had been created in 1872, giving public health and local government responsibilities for rural areas to the existing boards of guardians of poor law unions. Under the Local Government Act 1894, rural sanitary districts became rural districts from 28 December 1894. The district originally included the town of Hemel Hempstead, but when the town was made a municipal borough in 1898 it was removed from the rural district.

Parishes
The district contained the following civil parishes:

After Hemel Hempstead itself became a borough, the Hemel Hempstead Rural District district constituted two detached parts, north and south of Hemel Hempstead.  Bovingdon, Chipperfield, Flaunden and Kings Langley were in the southern part, with Flamstead, Great Gaddesden and Markyate in the northern part.

Premises
In its early years, the council met at the Union Workhouse on Redbourn Road in Hemel Hempstead. By 1912 the council had moved to offices on the south-west side of the junction of Bury Road, The Broadway, and Marlowes. (Bury Road and The Broadway have since been renamed to both become part of Queensway.) This building was called 1 The Broadway until the 1930s, when it was renamed 2 Marlowes.

In 1954 the council acquired The Bury, a large eighteenth century house on the north side of Bury Road and converted it to become their offices. The council's former offices at 2 Marlowes were demolished shortly afterwards to make way for the Hemel Hempstead College of Further Education (later Dacorum College, now part of West Herts College), which opened in 1962. The council remained based at The Bury until its abolition in 1974.

Abolition
Hemel Hempstead Rural District was abolished under the Local Government Act 1972, becoming part of the district of Dacorum on 1 April 1974.

References

Districts of England created by the Local Government Act 1894
Districts of England abolished by the Local Government Act 1972
History of Hertfordshire
Local government in Hertfordshire
Rural districts of England